Western Mass Lady Pioneers were an American women's soccer team, founded in 2004. The team was a member of the United Soccer Leagues W-League, the second tier of women's soccer in the United States and Canada. The team played in the Northeast Division of the Eastern Conference. The team folded after the 2009 season.

The team played its home games at Lusitano Stadium in the city of Ludlow, Massachusetts. The team's colours was black, white and red.

The team was a sister organization of the men's Western Mass Pioneers team, which plays in the USL Second Division.

Players

Squad 2015

Year-by-year

External links
 Western Mass Pioneers

   

Soccer clubs in Massachusetts
Women's soccer clubs in the United States
Defunct USL W-League (1995–2015) teams
Western Mass Pioneers
Ludlow, Massachusetts
2004 establishments in Massachusetts
2009 disestablishments in Massachusetts
Women's sports in Massachusetts